Charilaou is a district in eastern Thessaloniki, Greece.

The district was named after the banker and entrepreneur Epameinontas Charilaos, the landowner in the area, who had origins from the Ainos of Thrace. There is also the Ainou square named  after this town.

It is densely built-up and located above the Dépôt area and near Toumba and Pylaia. Its  main street is Papanastasiou Street where is also located Kleanthis Vikelidis Stadium.

Sport Clubs

Sources
Γειτονιές της πόλης: Χαριλάου

Populated places in Thessaloniki (regional unit)